Khaled Al-Mudhaf (born 12 June 1978) is a Kuwaiti sport shooter. He captured the men's trap title at the 2002 ISSF World Championships in Lahti, Finland, and finished in the top six respectively on two successive editions of the Olympic Games (2000 and 2004). Apart from his World championship title, Al-Mudhaf also collected fourteen more medals to his career record, including two from the Asian Games (a silver in Guangzhou 2010 and a bronze in Doha 2006). Al-Mudhaf is a member of the Kuwait City Shooting Club, where he trains full-time under Russian-born coach Rustam Yambulatov.

Career
Al-Mudhaf's Olympic debut came at the 2000 Summer Olympics in Sydney, where he placed fourth in the men's trap with a total score of 139, just a single clay away from the bronze medal won by Italy's Giovanni Pellielo.

Two years later, Al-Mudhaf reached the peak of his sporting career by claiming his first individual gold in a major international competition at the 2002 ISSF World Championships in Lahti, Finland. He hit a total of 146 targets to outplay the rest of the finalists field, including Pellielo and Olympic champion Michael Diamond for the trap title. Coming atop the podium, Al-Mudhaf also assured an Olympic quota for his native Kuwait, and was eventually selected to compete in his second Games.

At the 2004 Summer Olympics in Athens, Al-Mudhaf qualified for his second Kuwaiti team in the men's trap, after having achieved a minimum qualifying score of 122 from his top finish at the Worlds two years earlier. As one of the favorites vying for the Olympic medal in the sporting event, Al-Mudhaf put up another top-level effort with a qualifying score of 121 to take the fourth seed in the six-man finals, but fell out of the medals dismally to last under pressure after missing more targets than any other shooter in the field, finishing only with 141 hits.

After a disappointing Olympic feat, Al-Mudhaf came back to his noble form to pick up the bronze medal in the individual trap at the 2006 Asian Games in Doha, Qatar, and then upgraded to silver at the 2010 Asian Games in Guangzhou, attaining total scores of 128 and 137 clay pigeons respectively.

References

External links
 

1978 births
Living people
Sportspeople from Kuwait City
Kuwaiti male sport shooters
Olympic shooters of Kuwait
Shooters at the 2000 Summer Olympics
Shooters at the 2004 Summer Olympics
Shooters at the 2016 Summer Olympics
Asian Games gold medalists for Kuwait
Asian Games silver medalists for Kuwait
Asian Games bronze medalists for Kuwait
Shooters at the 1998 Asian Games
Shooters at the 2002 Asian Games
Shooters at the 2006 Asian Games
Shooters at the 2010 Asian Games
Shooters at the 2014 Asian Games
Shooters at the 2018 Asian Games
Asian Games medalists in shooting
Medalists at the 1998 Asian Games
Medalists at the 2006 Asian Games
Medalists at the 2010 Asian Games
Medalists at the 2014 Asian Games
Olympic shooters as Independent Olympic Participants
Trap and double trap shooters